Aungmraching Marma is a Bangladeshi women footballer who plays as a forward, and also can play as a midfielder. She played for Bangladesh women's national football team. She was also the captain of Bangladesh women's national football team.

Early years
Aungmraching Marma was born on 1990 in Khagrachari, Chittagong.

International career
In 2009 Aungmraching Marma in the  Bangladesh national team. She had been the national team captain.

International goals

Honours

International 

Bangladesh
South Asian Games
 Bronze medal: 2010

Club 

Sheikh Jamal Dhanmondi Women
 Bangladesh Women's Football League
Winners (1): 2011

Dhaka Abahani Women
 Bangladesh Women's Football League
Winners (1): 2013

References

1990 births
Living people
Bangladesh women's international footballers
Bangladeshi women's footballers
Bangladesh Women's Football League players
Women's association football forwards
Women's association football midfielders
People from Khagrachhari District
Bangladeshi Buddhists
Marma people
South Asian Games bronze medalists for Bangladesh
South Asian Games medalists in football